Suder is a surname. Notable people with the name include:
 Joseph Suder, German composer
 Pete Suder (1916–2006), American baseball player
 Scott Suder (born 1968), American politician from Wisconsin

Fictional
 Lon Suder, fictional character in Star Trek: Voyager

See also
 Suter, surname